
The third Robertson ministry was the fifteenth ministry of the Colony of New South Wales, and was led by John Robertson. It was the third of five occasions that Robertson was Premier. Robertson was elected in the first free elections for the New South Wales Legislative Assembly held in March 1856.

The title of Premier was widely used to refer to the Leader of Government, but not a formal position in the ministry until 1920.

There was no party system in New South Wales politics until 1887. Under the constitution, ministers were required to resign to recontest their seats in a by-election when appointed. Such ministerial by-elections were usually uncontested and on this occasion the ministers were all re-elected unopposed.

In 1876 William Forster was appointed Agent-General for New South Wales in London and was replaced as Colonial Treasurer by Alexander Stuart. In January 1877 Thomas Garrett was accused of bribery in relation to positions within the Department of Lands, and insobriety affecting his capacity to fulfill his responsibilities as minister. Garrett resigned as minister and the government narrowly survived a censure motion by 29 votes to 26. Ezekiel Baker replaced Garrett as Secretary for Lands.

This ministry covers the period from 9 February 1875 until 21 March 1877, when Robertson was unable to obtain supply and resigned when Henry Parkes indicated that he was able to form a government.

Composition of ministry

Ministers are members of the Legislative Assembly unless otherwise noted.

See also

Notes

References

 

New South Wales ministries
1875 establishments in Australia
1877 disestablishments in Australia